Indian Springs is an unincorporated community in western Washington County, Maryland, United States. Its population was 64 as of the 2010 census.

Geography
Indian Springs lies along U.S. Route 40 and Maryland Route 56 between Clear Spring and Hancock; it is located north of Fort Frederick State Park.

The area is traditionally defined as encompassing the narrow tract of land north of U.S. Route 40 between Fairview Mountain and the Licking Creek.

The terrain here differs greatly from the neighboring Hagerstown Valley, where elevations average less than 650' and is characterized by fertile, gently rolling hills. While land for farming is not as readily available in the Springs area, orchards have been a source of local livelihood for centuries.

The Indian Springs watershed is serviced by four primary runs: Lanes, Rabble, Rattle, and Indian Springs. These runs are tributaries of nearby Licking Creek. The Indian Springs for which the area was named have their headwaters on the west flank of Fairview Mountain.

Two solutional caves are also reported to exist in this area. Revell's and Darby Caves are both said to be developed in the Tonoloway Formation, a thin-bedded dolomitic limestone of the upper Silurian.

Much of the land not held by private individuals is part of the Indian Springs State Wildlife Preserve and is open to the public. A local sportsman's club also owns land adjoining the preserve. Several companies and institutions maintain equipment located atop the larger hills, including Johns Hopkins University, Verizon, and local radio stations; trespassing is strictly prohibited.

Demographics

Tourism
Indian Springs is located near the state-run Indian Springs Wildlife Management Area, a  tract of forestry that draws tourists for fishing, hiking, and hunting. Fishing is popular at Blair's Valley Lake and hunting deer is famous in the wooded areas. Fairview Mountain, located in the WMA, once served as a Civil War military signal post.

Camping is also common in campgrounds such as Indian Springs Kampgrounds, Maryland, McCoys Ferry Campground, and Little Pool Campground.

Footnotes

External links

 Indian Springs Kampgrounds, Maryland
 Indian Springs WMA

Unincorporated communities in Washington County, Maryland
Unincorporated communities in Maryland
Census-designated places in Washington County, Maryland
Census-designated places in Maryland